Sinostega ("Chinese roof") is an extinct genus of early "tetrapod" from the Late Devonian of China.

The fossil was discovered in the Ningxia Hui Autonomous Region, northwest China, and consist of a fragmentary lower jawbone measuring 7 cm in length. It is the first Devonian tetrapod to be found in Asia.

References 

 Zhu, M., Ahlberg, P. E., Zhao, W., and Jia, L.. 2002. "First Devonian tetrapod from Asia." Nature 420:760.

External links 
 http://news.nationalgeographic.com/news/2002/12/1218_021218_tetrapod.html
 http://english.cas.ac.cn/Eng2003/page/SRA/D_3.htm

Prehistoric tetrapod genera
Devonian animals of Asia
Fossils of China
Ichthyostegalia